Herman Batak (born May 16, 1983 in Medan, North Sumatra) is a retired Indonesian footballer.

Club statistics

References

External links

1983 births
Association football goalkeepers
Living people
Sportspeople from Medan
Indonesian footballers
Liga 1 (Indonesia) players
Bontang F.C. players
Deltras F.C. players
Persik Kediri players
Persiram Raja Ampat players
PSM Makassar players